Alberto Villareal y García was a Philippine international footballer who was captain of the Philippine national team that competed at the 1958 Asian Games. He is credited for leading the team that caused a 1-0 upset against host Japan. He was also part of the 1954 Asian Games squad.

Villereal was the eldest of three brothers all of which were national team players. He attended the De La Salle University where he obtained a bachelor's degree on Chemical Engineering. He was the captain of the university's junior and senior varsity team of the 1950s. At the club level, he played for the YCO Athletic Club which won the national championship within the same decade.

He died on July 5, 2017 in Vancouver, Canada at age 83.

References

2017 deaths
Filipino footballers
Philippines international footballers
Association footballers not categorized by position
Year of birth missing
Footballers at the 1958 Asian Games
Footballers at the 1954 Asian Games